This is a list of notable Costa Rican models.

Male models 
 Alonso Fernández Alvarez
 Rafael Rojas

Female models 

 Anastasia Acosta
 Brenda Castro
 Fabiana Granados
 Leonora Jiménez
 Leila Rodríguez Stahl
 Natalia Carvajal
 Wendy Cordero
 Carolina Coto Segnini
 Johanna Fernández
 Johanna Solano
 Maribel Guardia
 Mariluz Bermúdez
 Karina Ramos
 Bali Rodríguez

See also 
 List of Costa Ricans
 Miss Costa Rica

References 

 
Models
Costa Rican fashion
Lists of Costa Rican people